Milton Lee may refer to:

 Milton A. Lee, United States Army soldier and a Medal of Honor recipient
 Milton C. Lee, associate judge on the Superior Court of the District of Columbia
 Milton L. Lee, professor of chemistry

See also
 Milton Lee Olive Park, a public park in Chicago, Illinois